Xanthophyllum ecarinatum is a tree in the family Polygalaceae. The specific epithet  is from the Latin meaning "not keeled", referring to the fact that the petals do not form the shape of a boat (or carina).

Description
The smooth bark is pale grey or brown. The flowers are white when fresh.

Distribution and habitat
Xanthophyllum ecarinatum is endemic to Borneo. Its habitat is forests from sea-level to  altitude.

References

ecarinatum
Endemic flora of Borneo
Trees of Borneo
Plants described in 1896